Samuel Hubbard may refer to:

Samuel Decius Hubbard (1833–1910), Wisconsin legislator
Samuel Dickinson Hubbard (1799–1855), Connecticut congressman and United States Postmaster General
Samuel H. Hubbard, American college basketball and football coach
Samuel T. Hubbard, Jr. (1884–1962), cotton industry executive and military intelligence officer
Samuel Hubbard (Massachusetts judge) (died 1847), judge on the Massachusetts Supreme Judicial Court